Ablattaria is a genus of burying beetles or carrion beetles belonging to the family Silphidae. The beetles are predators of gastropods. All species in the genus exhibit sexual dimorphism.

Species
 Ablattaria arenaria (Kraatz, 1876) 
Ablattaria cribrata (Ménétries, 1832)
 Ablattaria laevigata (Fabricius, 1775) 
 Ablattaria subtriangula Reitter, 1905

References

Silphidae